Bakkaflói is a large bay in eastern Iceland, to the north of Bakkafjordur and to the southeast of Langanes.

Bays of Iceland